Laura E. Crane (born June 4, 1981) is an American lawyer who has served as a judge of the Superior Court of the District of Columbia since 2023. She previously served as an assistant United States attorney from 2014 to 2023.

Education 
Crane earned a Bachelor of Arts in English and Spanish from Duke University in 2003 and a Juris Doctor from the Washington University School of Law in 2009.

Career 
From 2010 to 2012, Crane worked as an associate at Cravath, Swaine & Moore in New York City. From 2012 and 2013, Crane served as a law clerk for Judge James E. Boasberg of the United States District Court for the District of Columbia. Crane was a senior associate at Wilmer Cutler Pickering Hale and Dorr in 2013 and 2014. Crane joined the United States Attorney's Office for the District of Columbia as an assistant United States attorney, where she served from 2014 to 2023.

D.C. superior court 
On July 14, 2022, President Joe Biden nominated Crane to serve as a judge of the Superior Court of the District of Columbia. President Biden nominated Crane to the seat vacated by Judge Steven N. Berk, who retired on November 1, 2021. On September 21, 2022, a hearing on her nomination was held before the Senate Homeland Security and Governmental Affairs Committee. On September 28, 2022, her nomination was favorably reported out of committee by voice vote en bloc, with Senators Rick Scott and Josh Hawley voting "no" on record. On December 15, 2022 her nomination was confirmed in the Senate by voice vote. She was sworn in on January 17, 2023.

References 

Year of birth missing (living people)
Living people
21st-century American lawyers
21st-century American women judges
21st-century American judges
21st-century American women lawyers
Assistant United States Attorneys
Cravath, Swaine & Moore associates
Duke University alumni
Judges of the Superior Court of the District of Columbia
Washington University School of Law alumni
Wilmer Cutler Pickering Hale and Dorr associates